National Route 841 (N841) is a , two-to-four lane national secondary route that forms part of the Philippine highway network, connecting the cities of Lapu-Lapu and Mandaue. It is carried by the Marcelo Fernan Bridge, constructed in 1996 and opened in 1999.

History 
The route was assigned N841 during the addition of National Routes in late 2016.

Route description 
The route starts as United Nations Avenue in Mandaue. After reaching the Marcelo Fernan Bridge, the route continues along a viaduct, with the route ending at the Mactan Circumferential Road (N845) in Lapu-Lapu City.

References 
Roads in Cebu